Blaengavenny Farmhouse, Llanvihangel Crucorney, Monmouthshire is a farmhouse of late medieval origins. It is a Grade II listed building. Its adjacent barn and granary have separate Grade II listings.

History
Cadw dates the earliest parts of the farmhouse to the period 1480–1520. In the 17th century, the hall was sub-divided creating an upper floor, with other work being undertaken. This later building is indicated by a date stone set in the porch with a date 1621. The Cadw listing record describes the farm as "exceptionally interesting with only minor alterations since 1621". It remains the private farmhouse to a working farm.

Architecture and description
The architectural historian John Newman describes the farmhouse as; "largely single-storeyed, consisting of two parts. Sir Cyril Fox and Lord Raglan, in the first of their three-volume study Monmouthshire Houses, give a plan showing the typical hall house layout. Peter Smith, in his study Houses of the Welsh Countryside, records Blaengavenny as an example of a half timbered house, a type relatively rare in Wales and generally located, as here, proximate to the England–Wales border. The farmhouse is Grade II* listed, with its barn and granary having separate, Grade II listings.

Notes

References 
 
 
 

Buildings and structures in Monmouthshire
Grade II* listed buildings in Monmouthshire